Valtissius is a genus of dirt-colored seed bugs in the family Rhyparochromidae. There are at least three described species in Valtissius.

Species
These three species belong to the genus Valtissius:
 Valtissius distinctus (Distant, 1901)
 Valtissius diversus (Distant, 1893)
 Valtissius pusillus (Barber, 1948)

References

Rhyparochromidae
Articles created by Qbugbot
Pentatomomorpha genera